Rjurik Petrovič Lonin (Ryurik Petrovich Lonin; born 22 September 1930 in Kaskezruchey (Kaskez’), Karelian ASSR, Soviet Union – 17 July 2009 in Shyoltozero (Šoutar’v), Prionezhskiĭ raĭon, Republic of Karelia, Russia) was a Veps student of the local lore and collector of Veps folklore, founder of The Rjurik Lonin Veps Ethnographic Museum in Šoutar’v (Shyoltozero), and an author in the Veps and Russian languages. He has been characterised as the most important Veps person ever to have lived and the best known Veps person of his time.

Biography
Rjurik Lonin was born in the village of Kaskez’ (Kaskezruchey) in modern-day Prionezhskiy rayon by Lake Onega as the first child from the second marriage of Pjotr Lonin (born ca. 1888). His mother was Fjokla Lonina (née Ryabčikova) from Ogerišt, Vehkoi (Vekhruchey) from the same area.

According to Lonin himself, he was named after Prince Rurik of Novgorod. His father believed that Prince Rurik had been Veps by ethnicity.

Lonin began school in Kaskez’ in the late 1930s. In 1941, when he was 11 years old, the Finnish Army occupied his home area during the Continuation War. He then continued to attend the Finnish school established by the occupiers. Lonin has said that only two people from his home village went to evacuation further in the Soviet Union. They were the head of the local kolkhoz, and the teacher Maria Ivanovna Pepšina (b. 1915). They were the only persons in the village who were members of the Communist Party of the Soviet Union. After the Finns retreated, he continued at school with the pre-war teacher. More than half a century later Lonin wrote a book about his war time experiences entitled Detstvo, opalyonnoye voĭnoĭ (‘A Childhood Scorched by War’). It which was published in 2004.

When Lonin was 16 years old, he moved to Petrozavodsk and studied in a vocational school, and from 1948 on he worked as a toolsmith and farm machinery repairman at a garage.

While living in the city, Lonin began to write poetry in Veps, and after various episodes he was asked to pay a visit to the Soviet Academy of Sciences, in its Karelian branch, at the Department of Languages, Literature and History (YALI), where Nikolai Bogdanov, researcher of the Veps language, urged him to begin to collect Veps folklore instead of writing poetry, which Lonin then began in 1956. He was no stranger to this task, having begun to collect Russian folk songs in his home village during the Finnish occupation. He now became an assistant to YALI, and he was given a letter of recommendation from the Academy of Sciences. Some items collected by Lonin were published in 1969 in the book Obrazcy vepsskoĭ reči (‘Samples of the Veps Language’). In the foreword of the book Lonin is described as “a resident of the Šoutar’v village, who is an enthusiastic collector of Veps folklore.

In 1958, while still living the Petrozavodsk, Lonin went to a concert held in the Sulazhgora neighbourhood. When the choir sang a Veps number, “Vepsän ma om randanröunal” (‘The Veps Land Lies Along the Shore’), he was overcome by homesickness and decided to move to the village of Šoutar’v, where his parents lived at the time. He found a job as a toolmaker at the village sovkhoz.

Founding of the Šoutar’v (Shyoltozero) Museum
In 1963, Lonin made his first folklore collecting trip outside of Karelia, to the Veps villages of the Lodeĭnopol’skiĭ raĭon in the Leningrad Oblast’. In 1964, on a similar trip, the idea occurred to him that he should try to found a Veps ethnographic museum in his home village of Šoutar’v. He repeatedly presented applications to this effect to the local village soviet, and finally in 1967, in honour of the 50th anniversary of the founding of the Soviet State, he was given two rooms from the village library for his museum. The opening was held on 28 October, a week before the anniversary of the Russian Revolution. In 1980 the museum became part of the Karelian Regional Museum, and in 1982 it was given new premises in the so-called Mel’kin House at Mel’kamättaz (‘Mel’kin’s Hill’) in Šoutar’v. It is the only museum in Russia dedicated to the presentation of Veps culture.

Lonin remained a scientific employee of the museum until 2001, and even later he worked there temporarily, when a substitute was needed, or for example, when the museum fence needed repair. His successor as the head of the museum is Ms. Natalya Ankhimova, originally from Ogerišt, Vehkoi.

In May 2010, the name of the museum was changed to The Rjurik Lonin Veps Ethnographic Museum in Šoutar’v (Shyoltozero).

Efforts to revive the Veps culture
Since the 1980s Lonin participated in the revival efforts of the Veps language and culture. He worked as a Veps language teacher at the Shyoltozero school in 1987–89, he translated the booklet Iisusan elo (‘The Life of Jesus’) and the Gospel of Mark, and although neither was printed, this marked the beginning of Bible translation in the Veps language. Lonin was later a part of group than commented upon the texts produced by Bible translator Nina Zaĭtseva.

Lonin was a long-time member of the Veps National Choir in Shyoltozero (1957–2001), and he even wrote a song about a twirling stick that the choir has regularly performed.

Lonin participated in the third Finno-Ugrian World Congress in Helsinki in December 2000, and he also participated in the First Veps Authors’ World Conference in Kuhmo, Finland, in the autumn of 2002.

Personal life
Rjurik Lonin’s wife Anna Lonina (b. 1937, Zalesye is also an accomplished poet in the Veps language. One of her works is entitled Mecantahgižed (‘The People of Zalesye/Mecantaga’).

Honours and decorations
During his life, Lonin was awarded the Jubilee Medal "For Valiant Labour - 100 Years of V. I. Lenin" (1970) and the Medal "Veteran of Labour" (1987). He was one of the winners of the All-Union Amateur Artists’ Festival (1985) as well as in the Second All-Union Popular Culture Festival (1987). He was given the title of Distinguished Cultural Worker of the Republic of Karelia in 1992, a medal and a diploma named after T. G. Ryabinin for Enlightenment Work in the Russian North (1995) and an award from the Open Society Institute of George Soros for Devoted Work.

Works
 Lühüdad pajoižed (‘Short Songs’, a collection of chastushkas). 71 p. Petroskoi: Karjalan valdkundan rahvhaližen politikan komitet, 2000. Painua: 1000.
 Minun rahvhan fol'klor (‘The Folklore of My People’). 108 p. Petroskoi: Periodika, 2000. Tiraž: 2000.
 Katalog lichnogo arhhiva Ryurika Petrovicaa Lonina. (‘Catalogue of the Personal Archive of Rjurik Lonin’.) Petrozavodsk: Sholtozerskiĭ ètnograficheskiĭ muzeĭ i Karel’skiĭ gosudarstvennyĭ krayevedecheskiĭ muzeĭ, 2000. Tiraž: 50.
 Zapiski krayeveda (‘Notes from a Student of the Local Lore’). 72 p. Petrozavodsk: Muzeĭnoye agenstvo, 2000. Tiraž: 150.
 Detstvo, opalyonnoye voĭnoĭ (‘A Childhood Scorched by War’). 99 p. Petrozavodsk: Verso, 2004. Tiraž: 500.
 Khranitel vepsskoĭ kultury (‘Keeper of the Veps Culture’). 95 p. Petrozavodsk, Sholtozero: Karelskiĭ gosudarstvennyĭ krayevedecheskiĭ muzeĭ/Karelskiĭ nauchnyĭ centr RAN, 2007. Tiraž: 300.

Lonin’s articles on the history of the Shyoltozero museum published in Finnish
 ”Vepsän vainioilla” (Beginning of Lonin’s memoirs). Punalippu (Petrozavodsk) 1/1982, p. 106–111.
 ”Vepsän vainoilla” (End of Lonin’s memoirs). Punalippu 2/1982, p. 116–123.
 ”Kiinnostukseni taustat”. (‘How I became interested (in my people’s culture)’) Punalippu 2/1989, p. 123–128.

Other writings by Lonin
“O sosdanii muzeya vepsskoĭ kul’tury v sele Shëltozero” (‘On the Founding of the Veps Museum in Šoutar’v.’). In: V. V. Pimenov, Z. I. Strogal’ščikova, Yu. Yu. Surhasko (ed.), Problemy istorii i kul’tury vepsskoĭ narodnosti (‘Problems of the History and Culture of the Veps People’). Petrozavodsk, 1989.

References

Vepsian people
Veps language
Ethnographers
1930 births
2009 deaths